Ichagarh  is a village in the Ichagarh CD block in the Chandil subdivision of the Seraikela Kharsawan district in the Indian state of Jharkhand.

Geography

Location                                  

Area overview 
The area shown in the map has been described as “part of the southern fringe of the Chotanagpur plateau and is a hilly upland tract”. 75.7% of the population lives in the rural areas and 24.3% lives in the urban areas. 

Note: The map alongside presents some of the notable locations in the district. All places marked in the map are linked in the larger full screen map.

Civic administration 
There is a police station at Ichagarh. 

The headquarters of Ichagarh CD block are located at Ichagarh village.

Demographics 
According to the 2011 Census of India, Ichagarh had a total population of 1,546, of which 755 (49%) were males and 791 (51%) were females. Population in the age range 0-6 years was 188. The total number of literate persons in Ichagarh was 933 (68.70% of the population over 6 years). 

(*For language details see Ichagarh block#Language and religion)

Education 
Bikramaditya High School is a Hindi-medium coeducational institution established in 1947. It has facilities for teaching in classes IX and X. The school has a library with 348 books.

References 
 

 

Villages in Seraikela Kharsawan district